The Redeemed Christian Church of God (RCCG) is a Pentecostal megachurch and denomination in Lagos, Nigeria.

Enoch Adeboye has been the General Overseer (most senior pastor) since 1981. The church in Lagos had an average church attendance of 50,000 in 2022.

History
The RCCG was founded in 1952 by Rev. Josiah Olufemi Akindayomi (1909–1980) following his involvement in other churches. Reverend Akindayomi chose Enoch Adejare Adeboye as the next General Overseer. Adeboye was a mathematics lecturer at the University of Lagos and joined the church in 1973. Adeboye was initially hired as an interpreter to translate Akindayomi's sermons from Yoruba to English. He was ordained a pastor of the church in 1975. His appointment as the leader (General Overseer) of the church was formalized by the posthumous reading of Akindayomi's sealed pronouncement. In 1990, the Redeemed Christian Church of God Bible School was founded.

In 1981, Pastor Enoch Adejare Adeboye became the General Overseer of the Church. In 1983, the land for the Redemption Camp in Mowe was purchased. In 1988, a students’ body known as the Redeemed Christian Fellowship (RCF) was established. It is the youth wing of the church, concentrated within tertiary institutions of learning in the country. In 1990, Christ the Redeemer’s Friends Universal (CRFU), was established to garner financial and human resources from the very wealthy in the society. In 2005, Redeemer's University was established.

Andrew Rice, writing in The New York Times, calls the RCCG "one of [Africa's] most vigorously expansionary religious movements, a homegrown Pentecostal denomination that is crusading to become a global faith". The church's leaders preach that in the future "In every household, there will be at least one member of Redeemed Christian Church of God in the whole world."

In 2008, it had 14,000 churches and five million members in Nigeria, in 80 countries.

The international church is structured in different areas throughout the world. The local churches are now grouped into regions, with 25 regions in Nigeria. It is also organised throughout most of the world. Notable special spiritual programs are the Holy Ghost Service, which holds on the first Friday of every month in Nigeria. Others include the annual Holy Ghost Convention  in August and the Holy Ghost Congress in December, both held in Nigeria, as well as others held abroad.

In 2020, the main church in Lagos had 50,000 people.

Beliefs
The official RCCG website outlines its beliefs in the Bible and the Holy Trinity, that the Devil exists, that God formed man in his image, in repentance, in cleansing from sins by God's grace, in sanctification, water baptism, Holy Spirit baptism, restitution and that God can heal without medicine (by His divine intervention e.g. through prayer).

See also

List of the largest evangelical churches
List of the largest evangelical church auditoriums
Worship service (evangelicalism)

References

External links
Official Website

Pentecostal denominations
Christian organizations established in 1952
Church of God denominations
Christian denominations established in the 20th century
1952 establishments in Nigeria
Churches in Lagos
Holiness denominations
Pentecostal denominations established in the 20th century
Evangelical megachurches in Nigeria
Pentecostal churches in Nigeria